Afroz Khan (born 17 July 1984) is an Indian first-class cricketer who represented Rajasthan. He made his first-class debut for Rajasthan in the 2002-03 Ranji Trophy on 19 December 2002.

References

External links
 

1984 births
Living people
Indian cricketers
Rajasthan cricketers